Démodé is Jean-Jacques Goldman's first solo album sung in French, set in 1981. It was recorded at the Studios Pathé in Paris and the Studio Vénus in Longueville.  The album has also been released under the names A l'envers and Jean-Jacques Goldman. It was certified platinum in France for sales of 300,000 copies.

Track listing
All tracks by Jean-Jacques Goldman

"A l'envers" – 3:54
"Sans un mot" – 3:29
"Brouillard" – 5:11
"Pas l'indifférence" – 4:12
"Il suffira d'un signe" – 5:50
"Je t'aimerai quand-même" – 4:54
"Autre histoire" – 4:19
"Quelque chose de bizarre" – 4:00
"Quel exil" – 2:59
"Le rapt" – 4:27
"Juste un petit moment" – 1:33

Personnel
Jean-Jacques Goldman: Acoustic and electric guitars, acoustic and electric piano, vocals
Patrice Tison: Electric guitars
Max Middleton: Keyboards
Georges Rodi: Synthesizers
Guy Delacroix: Bass
Clément Bailly: Drums, percussion
Bernard Illouz: Additional vocals

References

1981 debut albums
Jean-Jacques Goldman albums